TSFC may refer to:

 Team Socceroo F.C.
 Team Solent F.C.
 Thrust specific fuel consumption
 Tourette Syndrome Foundation of Canada